Greg Irons (September 29, 1947 – November 14, 1984) was an American poster artist, underground cartoonist, animator and tattoo artist.

Profile
Irons was born in Philadelphia, Pennsylvania. He moved to San Francisco, California, in 1967, where he soon found work designing posters for Bill Graham at The Fillmore Auditorium.

He worked on the film Yellow Submarine, then returned to work for Graham Productions. He soon branched out into album covers and "comix" work for the Print Mint, Last Gasp Eco-Funnies, and other local underground publishers. Irons' collaborations with writer Tom Veitch in the early 1970s (the creative team was known as "GI/TV") included Deviant Slice Funnies, Legion of Charlies. Other contributions to underground comics included Skull Comix and Slow Death. A solo comic entitled Light Comitragies was published in June 1971 by the Print Mint.

In the mid-1970s he began book illustration work, mainly for Bellerophon Books. One of these was a coloring-book format illustration of Chaucer's "The Wife of Bath's Prologue and Tale" which was issued with "The Miller's Tale" illustrated by Gilbert Shelton. In 1979, he illustrated The Official Advanced Dungeons & Dragons Coloring Album which was both a coloring book and a short adventure module authored by Gary Gygax. It was also around this time he began doing tattooing.

On November 14, 1984, while on a working vacation in Bangkok, Thailand, Irons was struck and killed by a bus.

The August 1985 issue of Swamp Thing, vol. 2, issue #39, written by Alan Moore, is dedicated to Greg Irons.

References

External links
 Tattoo Archive's biography
 Lambiek.net's biography
 Bio in Comics Journal
 Detailed writeup concerning the D&D coloring book
 Brief writeup about the D&D coloring book with illustrated title page

Underground cartoonists
American animators
American poster artists
American tattoo artists
1984 deaths
1947 births
Pedestrian road incident deaths
Artists from the San Francisco Bay Area
Road incident deaths in Thailand